Alsterdorfer Sporthalle (originally known as the Sporthalle Hamburg) is an indoor arena in Hamburg, Germany. The arena holds up to 7,000 people with 4,200 seats. It opened in 1968 and is located in the city's quarter of Winterhude.

It hosts mainly indoor sporting events (HSV Handball), pop & rock concerts and trade shows. The 1978 World Fencing Championships were held here. In July 2010, all matches of the FIBA Under-17 World Championship 2010 were played in this hall. In 11 May 2001, Irish vocal pop band Westlife held a concert for their Where Dreams Come True Tour supporting their album Coast to Coast. From 2012 until 2014 it also played host to the annual PDC World Cup of Darts.

References

External links 

Picture of the Alsterdorfer Sporthalle

Buildings and structures in Hamburg-Nord
Sports venues in Hamburg
Handball venues in Germany
Indoor arenas in Germany
Darts venues
Sports venues completed in 1968